is the 16th studio album by Japanese entertainer Miho Nakayama. Released through King Records on June 8, 1994, it features the single "Sea Paradise (OL no Hanran)". Like her previous studio releases Mellow and Wagamama na Actress, Pure White was self-produced and recorded in Los Angeles.

The album peaked at No. 3 on Oricon's albums chart and sold over 112,000 copies.

Track listing

Personnel
 Miho Nakayama – vocals
 Keisuke Araki – keyboards
 Yōichi Yamazaki –keyboards, piano
 Kazushi Ueda – guitar
 Masato Saitō – bass
 Hisanori Kumamaru – drums

Charts

References

External links
 
 
 

1994 albums
Miho Nakayama albums
Japanese-language albums
King Records (Japan) albums